John Craven Westenra (31 March 1798 – 5 December 1874) was an Irish Whig politician and army officer.

Born in Walsh Park, County Tipperary, Ireland, he was the son of Warner Westenra, 2nd Baron Rossmore and Mary Ann Walsh, and the brother of Henry Westenra, 3rd Baron Rossmore. He first married Eleanor Mary East née Jolliffe, daughter of William Jolliffe, in 1834. After she died in 1838, he then married Ann Daubuz, daughter of Lewis Charles Daubuz, in 1842, and they had at least one /child: Mary Anne Wilmot Westenra (died 1894).

An army officer, he at sometime achieved the rank of Lieutenant-Colonel in the Scots Fusilier Guards.

He was also a member of the Reform Club and, in 1863, held the office of High Sheriff of King's County.

References

External links
 

UK MPs 1835–1837
UK MPs 1837–1841
UK MPs 1841–1847
UK MPs 1847–1852
Whig (British political party) MPs for Irish constituencies
1798 births
1874 deaths
High Sheriffs of King's County
People from County Tipperary
Scots Guards officers
Younger sons of barons